”Speak, my Heart” is a poem by Arthur Christopher Benson, set to music by the English composer Edward Elgar in 1902.

The score was dated 16 August 1902 and it was published by Boosey & Co. in 1903 or 1904,. The first performance was possibly on 26 August 1902.

Lyrics

Sweet Maiden, bright Maiden,
Passing on your way,
 May I linger with you ?
Maiden, say !
“ I have much to see,
And far, far to go.
Let it be another day,
Now it is No ! ”
One word of welcome
Ere you depart !
I will be patient still ;
Silence, my heart !

Sweet Maiden, shy Maiden,
Passing far away,
 May I wander with you ?
Maiden, say !
” You are nought to me,
And I nought to you !
What am I to answer now ?
What can I do ? “
Wander alone then,
I will depart ;--
Yet she smiles upon me,
Courage, my heart !

True Maiden, dear Maiden,
Passing my door,
I will say a new word,
Whispered before.
” You may whisper softly,
Soft and still,
Yes, I will hear you out,
Say whate’er you will ! ”
Hear me and heed me,
Ere you depart ;
Yes, her lips are smiling ;--
Speak, my heart !

Recordings

"The Unknown Elgar" includes "Speak, my Heart" performed by Teresa Cahill (soprano), with Barry Collett (piano).

References

External links

Songs by Edward Elgar
1902 songs